Nyuguy is a rural locality (a selo) in Dzhidinsky District, Republic of Buryatia, Russia. The population was 311 as of 2010. There are 8 streets.

Geography 
Nyuguy is located 46 km southeast of Petropavlovka (the district's administrative centre) by road. Yonkhor is the nearest rural locality.

References 

Rural localities in Dzhidinsky District